Kyle Jones (born November 15, 1984 in Hamilton, Ontario) is an Olympian and former professional triathlete from Canada. He represented Canada at 13 World Championships and 5 Major Games competitions including the 2007, 2011 & 2015 Pan American Games, the 2014 Commonwealth Games and the 2012 Olympic Games in London. His career highlights include 3 National Championship titles, multiple ITU World Cup medals and a 6th place finish at the 2012 ITU World Championship Grand Final in Auckland, New Zealand.

At the 2012 Summer Olympics men's triathlon on Tuesday, August 7, he placed 25th.

Now retired from competitive sport, Kyle enjoys life in the Niagara region of Ontario with his wife and two sons. Beginning in May of 2018, Kyle partnered with former World XC Championship team member Jeff Scull. Together they co-own and operate EDGE Triathlon, an endurance sport coaching & consulting business servicing athletes in the Niagara region and online.

Sporting career 
Kyle was a member of Canada’s National Triathlon Team from 2006 to 2016. He started participating in triathlon when he was 10, encouraged by his father.  He won the Canadian Junior title in 2003 which sparked a move to Victoria, British Columbia to train at the National Training Centre. He made his ITU World Cup debut in 2005. Kyle has narrowly missed the podium at two Pan American Games with 4th-place finishes in 2007 (Rio de Janeiro) and 2011 (Guadalajara). In 2008 Kyle was selected as the alternate for the Canadian Olympic Team. In 2012 he won his first Canadian Senior title, his first ITU World Cup title, and represented Canada at the Olympic Games in London. Since then, he has added two more National titles, three more World Cup medals (2 - silver, 1 - bronze), and represented Canada at the 2014 Commonwealth Games in Glasgow, Scotland and the 2015 Pan American Games in Toronto, Ontario, Canada.

External links 
 Kyle Jones - Official Website
 EDGE Triathlon - Official Website

References 

1984 births
Living people
Canadian male triathletes
Triathletes at the 2012 Summer Olympics
Olympic triathletes of Canada
Triathletes at the 2014 Commonwealth Games
Sportspeople from Hamilton, Ontario
Triathletes at the 2015 Pan American Games
Commonwealth Games competitors for Canada
Pan American Games competitors for Canada